Below is a list of squads used in the 1963 African Cup of Nations.

Group A

Ethiopia
Coach: Yidnekatchew Tessema
|

Ghana
Coach: Charles Gyamfi
|

Tunisia
Coach: André Gérard
|

Group B

United Arab Republic
Coach: Fouad Sedki
|

Nigeria
Coach:  Jorge Augusto Pena
|

Sudan
Coach:  Lozan Kotsev
|

External links
African Nations Cup 1963 - Details and Scorers RSSSF
CAN 1963
Egyptian Results in African Cup of Nations

Africa Cup of Nations squads
Squads